Dingwall Thistle Football Club is an amateur football team from Dingwall in the Highlands of Scotland. They competed in the North Caledonian Football League before becoming a welfare club in the local Ross-shire League. They play their home matches at Jubilee Park and their home colours are all red.

References

Former North Caledonian Football League teams
Football clubs in Scotland
Football in Highland (council area)
Dingwall